Rodovia Adhemar de Barros (official designation SP-340) is a highway in the state of São Paulo, Brazil. It is 170 km long.

The highway follows very closely a south–north direction, departing from the city of Campinas, then passing by Jaguariúna, Holambra, Santo Antônio da Posse, Mogi Guaçu, Mogi Mirim, Estiva Gerbi, Aguaí, Casa Branca and ending at Mococa, near the border of the state of Minas Gerais.

The highway's name honours the former physician and twice Governor of the State of São Paulo, Adhemar Pereira de Barros. It is managed and maintained by a state concession to private company Renovias, and is therefore a toll road.

See also
 Highway system of São Paulo
 Brazilian Highway System

Highways in São Paulo (state)
Transport in Campinas